Euhyponomeuta is a genus of moths of the family Yponomeutidae.

Species
Euhyponomeuta rufimitrellus - Zeller, 1844 
Euhyponomeuta stannella - Thunberg, 1794 
Euhyponomeuta zhengi - Jin & Wang, 2011

References

Yponomeutidae